The Philippines competed at the 28th Southeast Asian Games from 5 to 16 June 2015. The Philippines contingent was composed of 472 athletes and 136 sporting officials participating in 35 out of the 36 sports.

Preparation
Singapore National Olympic Committee trimmed the number of "Traditional" sports and prioritized sports that are staged in the Olympics to increase the level of competition among nations in key sports. 24 of the 36 sports played in this edition will be Olympic Sports.

Philippines were eyeing for a decent finish in this edition of the Southeast Asian Games after a dismal finish of 7th place, its worst finish since joining the biennial event. After fielding 210 athletes in 2013, Philippines Sports Commission and Philippines Olympic Committee will now be going for "Quantity over Quality" to give the athletes the opportunity to not only bring home medals but also gain their needed experience in competing against the best of the best in Southeast Asia.

According to Chef-de-mission Julian Camacho, while the PSC goes for quantity they will still prioritize quality as well as young and upcoming athletes. Some National Sports Association must shoulder their expenses, should they win a medal their expenses will be reimbursed. PSC is confident that the Philippines will surpass their 2013 showing. Camacho predicted around 40 to 50 Gold medals. "The goal is to improve our finish in 2013 in Myanmar - whether it's sixth, fifth, fourth or higher," Camacho said.

POC chose Alyssa Valdez from the Women's Volleyball to carry the flag. POC also considered 2014 Asian Games Silver Medalist and Wushu specialist Daniel Parantac however he will be seeing action on the same day as the opening ceremony. Valdez becomes the first non medalist, as well as the first athlete from Volleyball, to lift the flag in the opening ceremonies of the biennial event.

POC is also considered to send the Men's Floorball Team. Singapore National Olympic Committee offered to shoulder all the expenses should the POC agree to send the Floorball Team. The POC sent the men's and women's national team to compete at the games but the latter were withdrew. Currently, there are only 3 NOC to play in women's Floorball, SEA Games rule is that there should be at least 4 participating nations in a sport to make the sport competitive.

Medalists

Gold

Silver

Bronze

Multiple

Competitors

Medal summary

By sports

By date

Archery

Men's Compound

Men's Recurve

Women's Compound

Women's Recurve

Athletics

Men's

Women's

Badminton

Basketball

Men
Team

Women
Team

Billiards and snooker

Men's

Women's

Bowling

Men

Women

Women's Masters

Boxing

Men's

Women's

Canoeing

Canoe-Kayak Flatwater 
Men

Cycling

Men

Women

Diving

Men

Women

Equestrian

Dressage

Jumping

Individual

Fencing

Men's

Women's

Floorball

Men's

Football
 
Squad

Head Coach: Marlon Maro

Golf

Men's

Women's

Gymnastics

Artistic Gymnastics
Men's

Individual

Women's

Individual

Judo

Men's

Women's

Netball

Pencak Silat

Pétanque

Men's

Women's

Rowing

Men's

Women's

Rugby Sevens

Men's

Women's

Sailing

Men's

Women's

Sepak Takraw

Shooting

Men's

Women's

Softball

Men's

Women's

Squash

Individual

Team

Swimming

Men's

Women's

Synchronized swimming

Table tennis

Singles and team

Doubles

Taekwondo

Men's

Women's

Poomsae

Tennis

Traditional Boat Race

Triathlon

Men's

Women's

Volleyball

Men's

Women's

Water Polo

Men's

Women's

Waterski

Wushu

Men's Taolu

Men's Sanda

Women's Taolu

References

External links
 

Southeast Asian Games
2015
Nations at the 2015 Southeast Asian Games